Margaret Moore Kennedy (23 April 1896 – 31 July 1967) was an English novelist and playwright. Her most successful work, as a novel and as a play, was The Constant Nymph. She was a productive writer and several of her works were filmed. Three of her novels were reprinted in 2011.

Family and education
Margaret Kennedy was born in Hyde Park Gate, London, the eldest of the four children of Charles Moore Kennedy (1857–1934), a barrister, and his wife Ellinor Edith Marwood (1861–1928). The novelist Joyce Cary was a cousin on her father's side.

She attended Cheltenham Ladies' College, where she began writing, and then went up to Somerville College, Oxford, in 1915 to read History. Other literary contemporaries at Somerville College included Winifred Holtby, Vera Brittain, Hilda Reid, Naomi Mitchison and Sylvia Thompson. She also became close friends with the Welsh author Flora Forster. Her first publication was a history book, A Century of Revolution (1922). Kennedy was married on 20 June 1925 to the barrister David Davies (1889–1964), who later became a county-court judge and a national insurance commissioner. He was knighted in 1952. They had a son and two daughters, one of whom was the novelist Julia Birley, born 13 May 1928 and author of at least 13 novels published between 1968 and 1985. The novelist Serena Mackesy is her granddaughter. Kennedy died at Flora Forsters's house at Adderbury, Oxfordshire on 31 July 1967.

Novels and plays
Kennedy is best appreciated today for her second novel, The Constant Nymph, which she adapted into a highly successful West End play that opened at the New Theatre, with Noël Coward and Edna Best in September 1926. Coward was replaced by John Gielgud during the run. It was also successfully filmed in 1928 by Adrian Brunel and Alma Reville, directed by Brunel and Basil Dean, and starring Ivor Novello, Mabel Poulton and Benita Hume, and again in 1933, 1938 (for television), and 1943.

Kennedy's first novel was The Ladies of Lyndon (1923). Among later successes were The Fool of the Family (1930), a sequel to The Constant Nymph, and the psychological novel A Long Time Ago (1932). The Midas Touch (1938) was a Daily Mail book of the month, The Feast (1949) a Literary Guild choice in the United States, and Troy Chimneys  (1953) winner of the James Tait Black Memorial Prize. The darkly humorous The Heroes of Clone (1957) drew on her experience as a screenplay writer. She also published a biography of Jane Austen and a study of the art of fiction, Outlaws on Parnassus.

Kennedy followed the stage success of The Constant Nymph (adapted in conjunction with Basil Dean) with three more co-written plays. The most successful was Escape Me Never (1934), adapting The Fool of the Family, which was also filmed twice.

Of her post-war novels, The Feast (1950) introduces the disaster first and the characters who may or may not have perished in it afterwards, as in Thornton Wilder's The Bridge of San Luis Rey. The seaside hotel annihilated by the collapse of the cliff is replete with dysfunctional characters of all ages and sizes, so providing a fine balance of suspense, sympathy and even humour. Still, it works on other levels too. Her novelist granddaughter Serena Mackesy has called it "one of the cleverest bits of metaphor-working ever." It was recently reprinted, as were Lucy Carmichael (1951) and The Midas Touch. Her final novel, Not in the Calendar: The Story of a Friendship, involves a friendship between a daughter of a wealthy family and the deaf daughter of one of their servants.

Kennedy's family donated her papers and correspondence to Somerville College Library.

Partial bibliography

Selected filmography
The Old Curiosity Shop (1934)
Escape Me Never: (1935) and (1947)
Whom the Gods Love (1936)
Dreaming Lips (1937)
Stolen Life (1939)
Return to Yesterday (1940)

References

External links

Entry in The Dictionary of Literary Biography

1896 births
1967 deaths
20th-century Australian women
20th-century English dramatists and playwrights
20th-century English women writers
20th-century English novelists
Alumni of Somerville College, Oxford
English women novelists
First women admitted to degrees at Oxford
James Tait Black Memorial Prize recipients